Abdallah ibn Ishaq ibn Ibrahim was a Mus'abid official in the service of the Abbasid Caliphate. He was briefly the governor of Baghdad in 851, and the governor of Fars in c. 863.

Career 
Abdallah was a member of the Mus'abid family, a collateral branch of the Tahirid dynasty. Following the death of Muhammad ibn Ishaq ibn Ibrahim in July 851, 'Abdallah succeeded him as governor of Baghdad and chief of security (shurtah) of the Sawad, but he quickly alienated his taxation officials by dealing with them in a harsh manner. In that same year he lost his position to Muhammad ibn Abdallah ibn Tahir, who arrived in October from Khurasan.

In ca. 863 Abdallah was appointed by Muhammad to act as his governor of Fars. While serving in that province, he withheld the pay of the local soldiers, which provoked them into rebelling against him and transferring their allegiance to 'Ali ibn al-Husayn ibn Quraysh. Lacking the means to counter the revolt, Abdallah was forced to abandon Fars and return to Baghdad.

Notes

References 
 
 

Tahirid governors of Baghdad
9th-century Iranian people
9th-century people from the Abbasid Caliphate
Abbasid governors of Fars